Do Not Disturb is a 2014 French comedy film directed by Patrice Leconte. The film was adapted from the stage play Une heure de tranquillité by Florian Zeller, who also wrote the screenplay for the film.

Cast 
 Christian Clavier as Michel Leproux 
 Carole Bouquet as Nathalie Leproux 
 Valérie Bonneton as Elsa 
 Rossy de Palma as Maria 
 Stéphane De Groodt as Pavel 
 Sébastien Castro as Sébastien Leproux 
 Christian Charmetant as Pierre 
 Arnaud Henriet as Léo 
 Jean-Pierre Marielle as Michel's father
 Jean-Paul Comart as The seller

References

External links 
 

2014 films
2014 comedy films
2010s French-language films
French comedy films
Films directed by Patrice Leconte
French films based on plays
2010s French films